Fakenham East railway station was a railway station in the market town of Fakenham in the English county of Norfolk.

The station was opened by the Norfolk Railway on 20 March 1849 and was originally named Fakenham. Following nationalisation, it was renamed Fakenham East by British Railways on 27 September 1948; it was closed on 5 October 1964.

This station is one of the possible sites protected in local plans, if needed as part of the Norfolk Orbital Railway's long-term plans to return trains to Fakenham.  Any replacement station would be built on the throat of the original site, as sheltered housing has been built on the main station site. Other developments north of the former station make further extension impractical; instead the 'Norfolk Orbital' scheme proposes reopening towards the North Norfolk line at Holt and the Mid-Norfolk line at County School. The railway formation south of the station, as far as the three-arch viaduct over the River Wensum, is now owned by the Norfolk Orbital Railway.

There was also a Fakenham West railway station, on the Midland and Great Northern Joint Railway between King's Lynn and Great Yarmouth, which closed in 1959.

References

See also
 List of closed railway stations in Norfolk

Disused railway stations in Norfolk
Former Great Eastern Railway stations
Railway stations in Great Britain opened in 1849
Railway stations in Great Britain closed in 1964
Beeching closures in England
1849 establishments in England
Fakenham